Leon Augustine Asokan (born 2 October 1998), is an Indian professional footballer who plays as a winger for Bengaluru in the Indian Super League.

Club career
Born in Kozhikode, Leon started his youth career at Bengaluru B After one year in the academy and the reserves team he was promoted to the senior squad of Bengaluru and was named in the 30 men squad for the 2018 AFC Cup by Albert Roca He made his professional debut for the senior side in the AFC Cup against Abahani Limited Dhaka on 14 March 2018 as he came off the bench in the second half of the match which Bengaluru FC won by 1-0.

Career statistics

Honours

Bengaluru
 Durand Cup: 2022

References

External links
 

Living people
1998 births
Indian footballers
Association football forwards
Indian Super League players
Bengaluru FC players
Footballers from Kerala
Sportspeople from Kozhikode